Live from the Center of the Universe is the first and only 24/7 television channel broadcasting to the world, in English, from Israel.

The channel was created, in part, to provide balance of viewpoints provided by mainstream news channels and Al Jazeera America.

Established by Rabbis Jay Schechter and Saruk Eshel in 2013, dual American-Israeli citizens, the Channel also provides voices from the Holy Land,
showcasing programming featuring the people, culture and spiritual beliefs of the people who call Israel their home.

The Channel airs programming promoting peace and understanding between Jews and Arabs as part of the peaceful existence of the State of Israel. LIVE does not engage in propaganda but rather focuses on providing a full and accurate representation of the current situation in Israel. The Channel is designed to speak on different levels
to Jews, Christians and Arabs.

A typical hour of programming on LIVE might contain news reports from Israel, an inspirational message from a religious leader, and a documentary about the history of Israel, including biblical, or about current conflicts in the region.
Programming also includes tourism and investment related videos produced by the State of Israel.

LIVE also provides multi-day television events such as Chanukkah Live! featuring diverse holiday programming, much of which comes from Israel.  The Channel also airs programming from the worldwide Jewish community.

Live from the Center of the Universe is carried on the FilmOn platform worldwide and is available on television via Apple TV and Roku.

References

Television in Israel